Armed Forces Recreation Centers (AFRCs) are a chain of Joint Service Facility resorts hotels owned by the United States Department of Defense to provide rest and relaxation in the form of lodging and outdoor recreation for United States military service members, US military retirees and other authorized patrons.

Rates for use of these facilities are determined by rank, with the lowest ranking service-members paying the lowest fees. The facilities are often located in areas where typical hotel and resort rates are very high, thus allowing the members of the military lower cost vacations. Hale Koa Hotel at Fort DeRussy, Hawaii is the only AFRC resort inside a military reservation in the United States.

Army Installation Management Command (IMCOM) G9 directly manages the AFRCs to provide all uniformed services with high-quality, affordable resort-style facilities consistent with the Army's focus on readiness and quality of life for Service Members and their Families.

Authorized guests 
 Active duty members and their families of the U.S. Armed Forces.
Retired members of Active Duty, Reserves, and the National Guard
 Members of the Reserve components of the United States Armed Forces, Reserve and National Guard.
 Retired Reservist and National Guardsmen not yet age 60 (Gray Area).
 Honorably discharged veterans with 100 percent service-connected disability certified by the Department of Veterans Affairs (VA).
 Current civilian and retired employees of the Department of Defense.
 Former and/or Surviving Spouses and Family Members of a Retired member of the Armed Forces or of personnel who died while on active duty.
 Involuntarily separated service members under the Transition Assistance Management Program.
 Personnel separated under the Voluntary Separation Incentive (VSI) and Special Separation Benefit (SSB) programs for two years after separation from service.
 U.S. employees of firms under contract to Department of Defense working in the Pacific Region outside the U.S. on Department of Defense Government orders.
Military personnel of foreign nations and their family members when assigned or attached to a U.S. military unit or installation or on U.S. Travel Orders.
Those newly authorised under the Disabled Veterans Equal Access Act of 2018 (only available at Shades of Green and Hale Koa)

Resorts
The five resorts include:

Shades of Green located in Walt Disney World in Orlando, Florida
Edelweiss Lodge and Resort located in Garmisch-Partenkirchen, Germany
Dragon Hill Lodge located in Seoul, Korea
Hale Koa Hotel located on Fort DeRussy, Hawaii
New Sanno Hotel located in Tokyo, Japan

References

External links
Armed Forces Recreation Centers
U.S. Army MWR
US Navy Lodge
Poppin' Smoke Travel Blog about Dragon Hill Lodge
Military in Germany Travel Blog about Edelweiss Lodge and Resort
Decriptions of Armed Forces Recreation Centers